Hurl Luther III. Beechum (born 2 May 1973) is a retired German professional basketball player who formerly played for the Telekom Baskets Bonn of the German Basketball League.

His last team as an active player was BK Prostejov in the Czech Republic.

He played for Germany's national basketball team on several occasions.

References

External links
 Saporta Cup Profile
 Eurobasket.com Profile

1973 births
Living people
Apollon Patras B.C. players
Baloncesto Fuenlabrada players
CB Valladolid players
German expatriate basketball people in Spain
German men's basketball players
German people of American descent
Iowa State Cyclones men's basketball players
Liga ACB players
Shooting guards
Small forwards
Sportspeople from Bonn
Basketball players from Des Moines, Iowa
Telekom Baskets Bonn players